Camp Fatima is a Catholic overnight summer camp located in Gilmanton Iron Works, NH. The camp has a waterfront on the northern shore of Upper Suncook Lake.

History 

The camp was founded in 1949 by Richard Boner, after the previous establishment, a Jewish camp named Camp Wingo, closed and relocated to Maine. The camp is named after Our Lady of Fátima, a Marian apparition observed in 1917 by three shepherd children at the Cova da Iria, in Fátima, Portugal.

New Hampshire Governor Chris Sununu attended Camp Fatima from 1984 to 1989.

Program 
Camp Fatima has 4 normal sessions during the summer, each session is 2 weeks long. Along with the normal sessions, the camp also offers a special needs week. The camp programs are as follows:
Juniors: Ages 6–10
Intermediates: Ages 11–12
Seniors: Ages 13–14
Club 15: Age 15
For those who wish to attend the camp over the age of 15, they can apply for the CIT (Counselor in Training) program. For the campers, the camp has cabins, with each cabin having approximately 8 bunk beds.

Notes

Gilmanton, New Hampshire
Fatima